Empelathra is a genus of moths of the family Erebidae. The genus was erected by Francis Walker in 1858.

Species
Empelathra amplificans Walker, 1858
Empelathra choria Schaus, 1906

References

Calpinae